Jaljala is a rural municipality in Parbat District of Gandaki Province, of Nepal. It was mapped by merging the pre-existing rural development committees of Parbat District including Baskharka, Mallaj Majhphant, Lekhphant, Dhairing, Nagliwang, Banau and Salija.

The total population of this rural municipality is 21,454. Its area is 82.26 km square. The main office is located at the pre-existing head office of Mallaj Majhphant. The rural municipality is divided into 9 wards. The neighboring local authorities includes Modi rural municipality in the east, Myagdi and Parbat districts in the west, Myagdi District in the north and Kusma municipality and Baglung District in the south.

Demographics
At the time of the 2011 Nepal census, Jaljala Rural Municipality had a population of 21,527. Of these, 94.3% spoke Nepali, 4.0% Magar, 0.3% Bhojpuri, 0.3% Gurung, 0.3% Newar, 0.2%Hindi, 0.2% Tamang and 0.4% other languages as their first language.

In terms of ethnicity/caste, 23.9% were Magar, 22.8% Hill Brahmin, 20.5% Chhetri, 16.8% Damai/Dholi, 5.5% Kami, 2.5% Sarki, 2.3% Thakuri, 1.4% Newar, 0.9% Sanyasi/Dasnami and 3.4% others.

In terms of religion, 81.6% were Hindu, 15.9% Buddhist, 1.4% Christian, 0.8% Muslim and 0.3% others.

References

Populated places in Parbat District
Rural municipalities of Nepal established in 2017
Rural municipalities in Parbat District